Mani Majra, also spelled as Manimajra and now renamed as Sector 13, is a Big historical town in Chandigarh, India

The notifications regarding the renaming of this town were issued by the Punjab Governor and Chief Administrator of Chandigarh, VP Singh Badnore under the Punjab Reorganization Order 1966 under the Sub-section (2) of Sector-1 of the Capital of Punjab (Development and Regulations) Act 1952.

It is mainly a residential hub having various societies such as Mari Wala Town (M.W.T.), Pipliwala Town (P.W.T.), Shanti Nagar, Subhash Nagar, Shastri Nagar, Adarsh Nagar, Kishangarh, Bhagwanpura, New Indira Colony, Old Indira Colony, Dharshani Bhag, Samadhi Gate, Mohalla Jattan Wala, Mohalla Main Bazar, Govindpura, Mori gate, Nagla Mohalla, Shivalik Enclave, Modern Housing Complex (M.H.C.), Duplex, Rajeev Vihar and Uppal's Marble Arch, Railway Colony, Mouli Jagra, Mouli Pind, Vikas Nagar, Daria, Railway Station, and Asia's no. 1 Motor Market is Situated in Manimajra. Two multiplexes, Fun Republic and DT mall are also situated nearby for shopping and Cinema. Sports complex, GOVT Dispensary, Shivalik Park, RIMT World School, DC Montessori school, Gurukul Global School, Lohia International School, and 4 GOVT schools are also available in Manimajra.
The Rajiv Gandhi IT Park of Chandigarh is also planned in Manimajra. Various corporations — such as, Airtel, Infosys, Tech Mahindra — have built their campuses here. A 5-star hotel 'The Lalit' is also there at IT Park Industrial Area with a petrol pump before the hotel.

The town also is home to an old fort that is undergoing restoration as a part of an Archeological Survey of India's restoration project. Parts of the Hollywood film Zero Dark Thirty were shot in Mani Majra.

Temple
Manimajra Shiv Temple and Thakurdwara is 500 to 600 years old, and was built by the rulers of the area. Shiv temple has Shiva as the main deity and Thakurdwara has Rama, Sita, and Hanuman as chief deities. The famous Mata Mansa Devi Mandir is located a few kilometers' distance from Manimajra.

Mani Majra Fort

Mani Majra was a princely state during the Sikh period and there is a fort built by Gareeb Dass native of the area, Jatt by caste, and MULLANPUR GAREEBDASS a village near Chandigarh border is also on his name

Gallery

References

External links
 First Raj of the Sikhs: The Life and Times of Banda Singh Bahadur

Cities and towns in Chandigarh district